Jefferson School may refer to:

Jefferson School (Massachusetts), a historic school building in Weymouth, Massachusetts
Jefferson Schools, a school district in Frenchtown Charter Township, Michigan
Jefferson School (Cape Girardeau, Missouri), a historic school building
Jefferson School of Social Science (1944-1956), a New York City adult education and training facility of the Communist Party USA
Jefferson Schoolhouse, Indian Hill, Ohio
Jefferson School (Clifton Forge, Virginia), a historic school building
Jefferson School (Charlottesville, Virginia), a historic school building

See also
Jefferson Elementary School (disambiguation)
List of schools named after Thomas Jefferson